The Shanes are a German folk rock, folk punk, and polka band from Trier, active from 1991 until the present. The band has published 11 albums and tours mainly in Germany, Switzerland, Austria and Luxembourg, but they have also performed in the United States/Texas, Great Britain, France and Hungary.

Members
Kornelius Flowers (since 1991) - vocals
Jörg "Warpig" Stoffregen (since 2004) - guitar, banjo, mandolin
Matt Dawson (since 2011) - pedal steel, dobro, mandolin
Chris Birch (since 2011) - fiddle
Nataša Grujović (since 2008) - accordion
Herr Dannehl (since 1994) - bass guitar, upright bass
"Boergermeister" Markus Schu (since 2006) - drums

Albums
1992: Songs From the Urban Country Hell (Strangeways/Indigo)
1993: Polka Hard (Strangeways/Indigo)
1994: Love Will Tear Us Apart – Vinyl-Single (Strangeways/Indigo)
1995: These Days EP (Strangeways/Indigo)
1996: Budapest Sessions feat. VEZERKAR (HU)
1998: 5 Years of Hard Polka 1993-1998
2001: The Haunted House Of Polka (Pinorrekk/Edel)
2005: Pölka (SumoRex/Broken Silence)
2007: Polka over Serbja – live in Chośebuz (SumoRex/Broken Silence)
2009: Squandering Youth (SumoRex/Broken Silence)
2013: Road Worrier (SumoRex/Broken Silence)

References

German rock music groups